Maddington Falls, Quebec is a municipality in the Centre-du-Québec region of Quebec, Canada.

References

(Google Maps)

Municipalities in Quebec
Incorporated places in Centre-du-Québec